Du Ab District, Dō Āb District, Du'ab District, Doab District, (two waters ) is a district of Nuristan Province, in eastern Afghanistan.

History
The Taliban launched an attack on the Du Ab and Qatar Khak areas on 31 January 1997. Between June 4 and June 5, 2021, the district fell to the Taliban forces after 20 days of fighting. This marked the 7th district to fall to the Taliban since May 1, 2021.

References

External links

Districts of Nuristan Province